Fácánkert is a village in Tolna county, Hungary.

The village of Facankert is located in the Hungarian county of Tolna. It hosts the estate of Count Festetich, which he lived in from 1904 to 1907, until a wealthy merchant family, the Kunffy's, purchased it and began to grow crops there.

References

Populated places in Tolna County